Arthur Reynolds Griffin (26 September 1883 – 16 July 1967) was a New Zealand architect based in Nelson during the first half of the 20th century. His notable works include the Hokitika Carnegie Library, the church steps in Nelson (also known as the Cawthron steps) (1913), and the Ritz Louis Kerr building (1930) in Nelson.

Biography
Griffin was born in Nelson on 26 September 1883, the son of John Hollis Griffin and Martha Louisa Griffin (née Biss). His grandfather, John Griffin, was the founder of biscuit manufacturer Griffin and Sons Limited. He was educated at Nelson College for one year, in 1898, winning the fourth-form drawing prize.

Griffin began his architectural career as a draughtsman with Robertson Brothers in Nelson for four years, and during the same period studied architecture through the International Correspondence School in Pennsylvania. He set up his own practice in Hardy Street, Nelson, in January 1906, after winning a competition for the design of the Hokitika Carnegie Library. In 1907, he won a second architectural competition, for the new central girls' school in Shelbourne Street, Nelson. Between 1908 and 1909, Griffin served as the Nelson Education Board's architect, but was dismissed after the board determined that he had claimed for fees additional to those to which he was entitled. However, during that short period he completed a number of new schools and extensions for the Education Board.

In 1908, Griffin married Barbara Ellen Warnock, and by 1909 they were living at 18 Ngatitama Street, Nelson. Griffin remained in practice until about 1960, but was semi-retired from the 1940s. He produced a diverse range of work, including many commercial buildings in central Nelson, churches, private residences, and significant buildings for Nelson Hospital. He died on 16 July 1967, and was buried at Marsden Valley Cemetery, Stoke. He had been predeceased by his wife in 1965.

Notable works
Notable buildings and structures designed by Griffin include:

Notes

References

 
 
 
 
 
 
 
 
 
 
 
 
 
 
 
 
 
 
 
 
 
 
 
 

1883 births
1967 deaths
People from Nelson, New Zealand
People educated at Nelson College
New Zealand architects
Burials at Marsden Valley Cemetery